The Great Arctic State Nature Reserve is a nature reserve in Krasnoyarsk Krai, Russia.

History
The Great Arctic State Nature Reserve was founded on May 11, 1993 by Resolution No.431 of the Government of the Russian Federation. The Nature Reserves in Russia are known as zapovedniks.

Topography
The Great Arctic State Nature Reserve is divided into nine sections:
Dikson - Sibiryakov section.
It includes the Sergei Kirov Islands, the Voronina Island, the Izvestiy TSIK Islands, the Arkticheskiy Institut Islands, the Sverdrup Island, the Uyedineniya Island and a number of smaller islands. This section represents rather fully the natural and biological diversity of Arctic Sea islands of the eastern part of the Kara Sea.
The Pyasina section. Includes the Pyasina Bay and the Pyasina river basin.
The Middendorff Bay
The Nordenskiöld Archipelago
The Lower Taymyr section. Includes the basin of the Taymyr River (upper and lower), as well as Lake Taymyr.
The Chelyuskin Peninsula. Includes the northern end of the Taymyr Peninsula
The Northern Reserve (Североземельский).
The Brekhovsky Islands Natural Reserve

Ecoregion and climate
The Great Arctic Reserve is located in the Taimyr-Central Siberian tundra ecoregion, which covers the Taymyr Peninsula in the Russian Far North.  The climate is Tundra (Köppen climate classification Tundra climate (ET)). This indicates a local climate in which at least one month has an average temperature high enough to melt snow (0 °C (32 °F)), but no month with an average temperature in excess of 10 °C (50 °F).

Flora and fauna

Many animals and plants are meant to thrive within the Great Arctic State Nature Reserve without human disturbance. Among the animals that are protected by this reserve, some of the most important are the polar bear, the Arctic fox, the snowy owl, the reindeer and the beluga.

References

External links

 Nature Reserve
 Bolshoi Arkticheskiy state nature reserve
 Map and pictures

Nature reserves in Russia
Geography of Krasnoyarsk Krai
Protected areas of the Arctic
Protected areas established in 1993
1993 establishments in Russia
Krasnoyarsk Krai
Zapovednik